Pleß or Pless may refer to:

Places
Pleß, a municipality in the district of Unterallgäu in Bavaria, Germany
 Pszczyna (German: Pleß), a town in southern Poland
 Duchy of Pless, a historic territory in Silesia 
 Pleß (mountain), a mountain in Thuringia, Germany

People
 Daisy, Princess of Pless (1873–1943), noted society beauty in the Edwardian period
 Artūrs Toms Plešs, (born 1992), Latvian politician
 Helmut Pleß, Knight's Cross of the Iron Cross recipient in 1944
 Kristian Pless (born 1981), Danish tennis player
 Leonie Pless (born 1988), German rower
 Rance Pless (1925–2017), American baseball player
 Stephen W. Pless (1939–1969), United States Medal of Honor recipient
 Vera Pless (1931–2020), American mathematician
 Willie Pless (born 1964), Canadian footballer

See also
 (including Pless)
 Ples (disambiguation)
 Pleš (disambiguation)